The 2008 Virginia Republican presidential primary took place on February 12, 2008. This was an open primary with 63 delegates (60 pledged delegates) at stake in a winner take all format. The District of Columbia and Maryland both held primaries on the same day, referred to as the "Potomac primary".

John McCain won the primary, receiving all of Virginia's delegates to the 2008 Republican National Convention.

Results 

*Candidate suspended campaign prior to this primary

See also 

 2008 Republican Party presidential primaries
 2008 Virginia Democratic presidential primary

References 

Virginia
2008 Virginia elections
2008